Bruce Gordon Elmegreen (born 24 February 1950) is an American astronomer.

Life 
Elmegreen was born in Milwaukee, and received his bachelor's degree in 1971 from the University of Wisconsin–Madison and his PhD in 1975 from Princeton University in astrophysics under Lyman Spitzer. From 1975 to 1978 he was a Junior Fellow at Harvard University. From 1978 to 1984 he was an assistant professor at Columbia University. Beginning in 1984 he has been employed at IBM doing research at the Thomas J. Watson Research Center.

His research deals with interstellar gas with a focus on star formation in gaseous nebulae and large-scale structure of spiral galaxies. Using computer model simulations, he proved the existence of standing waves in spiral galaxies.

Since 1976 he has been married to the astronomer Debra Meloy Elmegreen (born 1952), who is a professor at Vassar College. In 2013, they authored a paper together, "The Onset of Spiral Structure in the Universe", published in the Astrophysical Journal.

Honors and awards 
 In 2001 Elmegreen received the Dannie Heineman Prize for Astrophysics.
 In 2020 he was elected a Legacy Fellow of the American Astronomical Society.
 Asteroid 28364 Bruceelmegreen, discovered by astronomers with the LONEOS project in 1999, was named in his honor. The official  was published by IAU's Working Group Small Body Nomenclature on 15 October 2021.

References

External links 
 Bruce G. Elmegreen - Hubble Heritage Project

1950 births
Living people
American astrophysicists
20th-century American astronomers
21st-century American astronomers
University of Wisconsin–Madison alumni
Princeton University alumni
Scientists from Milwaukee
Columbia University faculty
Fellows of the American Astronomical Society
Winners of the Dannie Heineman Prize for Astrophysics